Laughlin is an unincorporated community in Mendocino County, California.

A post office operated at Laughlin for a time in 1892, and from 1903 to 1911. The name honors James H. Laughlin, Jr., a landowner.

References

Unincorporated communities in California
Unincorporated communities in Mendocino County, California